Gene Sandvig (born February 8, 1931) is an American speed skater. He competed in two events at the 1956 Winter Olympics.

His sister Connie Sandvig was a speed skater who competed at national level and his daughter Susan Sandvig competed at international level. The daughter of Connie Sandvig, Amy Peterson competed as a short track speed skater at five winter Olympics.

References

1931 births
Living people
American male speed skaters
Olympic speed skaters of the United States
Speed skaters at the 1956 Winter Olympics
Sportspeople from Minneapolis